Africanacetus is an extinct genus of ziphiid cetacean known from skulls found in seafloor sediments of Late Miocene to Early Pliocene age off the coasts of South Africa (Banzare Bank) and Brazil (São Paulo Ridge).

Systematics 
Two species are known, A. ceratopsis and A. gracilis. Both are distinguished by their cranial proportions, with A. gracilis having a more slender skull than A. ceratopsis.

References 

 

Ziphiids
Prehistoric cetacean genera
Miocene cetaceans
Miocene mammals of Africa
Pliocene mammals of South America
Neogene Brazil
Fossils of Brazil
Fossils of South Africa
Fossil taxa described in 2007